"Till I Gain Control Again" is a country song written by Rodney Crowell and originally recorded by Emmylou Harris in 1975. The song was included on her 1975 studio album Elite Hotel.  The song is most known by the No. 1 single version recorded by Crystal Gayle on her 1982 album, True Love.

Waylon Jennings covered this song on his 1977 album, Ol' Waylon. Willie Nelson covered it on his 1978 live album Willie and Family Live.  Jerry Jeff Walker also covered the song in 1978 on his Contrary to Ordinary album.  Bobby Bare covered the song in 1979.  Crowell recorded his own version of the song as well in 1981 on his self-titled album. The eclectic band This Mortal Coil covered it on their 1991 album Blood.  Blue Rodeo covered the song in 1993. Van Morrison covered it on his 2006 Pay the Devil album. Alison Krauss recorded it in 2016 as part of a tribute album to Harris titled: The Life & Songs of Emmylou Harris.

Composition
Rodney Crowell wrote the song while working for Jerry Reed's publishing company. At the time, he was hanging out with noted songwriters Townes Van Zandt, Guy Clark, and Steve Runkle, and wanted to show his own songwriting skill.

In retrospect, Crowell expresses regret at rhyming "been" with "can" in the lyric "What you've seen is what I've been/There is nothing I could hide from you/You see me better than I can." Had he written the song later in his career, Crowell says he would have spent time to find a hard rhyme. Crowell marvels when people tell him this song is their favorite of his. Crowell's version was released on his third (self titled) album in 1981.

Crowell wrote the song back-to-back with "Song for the Life" (recorded on his debut album Ain't Living Long Like This) in the 1970s and says both are a "projection into the future that I later lived through . . . and it was exactly like I predicted."

Crystal Gayle version

In 1982, the song would be recorded by Crystal Gayle and her recording was her tenth number one on the country chart.  Her recording would go to number one for one week and spend a total of twelve weeks on the chart. A music video was filmed for the song.

Charts

Weekly charts

Year-end charts

Blue Rodeo version

In 1993, the song was covered by Canadian country rock band Blue Rodeo for their album Five Days in July. Released as a single in 1994, the song peaked at number 24 on the RPM Country Tracks chart.

Chart performance

References

1975 songs
1982 singles
1994 singles
Emmylou Harris songs
Waylon Jennings songs
Willie Nelson songs
Crystal Gayle songs
Blue Rodeo songs
Songs written by Rodney Crowell
Song recordings produced by Allen Reynolds
Song recordings produced by Jimmy Bowen
Elektra Records singles